Peter Morrell Neal (September 21, 1811 – April 13, 1908) was a Massachusetts politician who served in both branches of the Massachusetts legislature and was the tenth Mayor of Lynn, Massachusetts.

Neal was the grandfather of Lynn's thirty first mayor, Charles Neal Barney.

See also
 1876 Massachusetts legislature

Notes

Mayors of Lynn, Massachusetts
Republican Party members of the Massachusetts House of Representatives
Republican Party Massachusetts state senators
Massachusetts Free Soilers
1811 births
1908 deaths